Rudá Hvezda Brno, also known as Red Star Brno and RH Brno was a Czechoslovak football club from the city of Brno. The club existed from 1956 until 1962, playing four seasons in the Czechoslovak First League, the country's top flight. After the 1961/62 season it amalgamated with Spartak ZJŠ Brno.

First division rankings
1957/58 – 7th
1958/59 – 5th
1959/60 – 10th
1960/61 – 12th

Honours
Czechoslovak Cup: 1959/60

European competition
Q = Preliminary round
1/4 = Quarter finals

References

Association football clubs established in 1956
Association football clubs disestablished in 1962
Brno, Ruda Hvezda
Brno, Ruda Hvezda
Sport in Brno